The Naked Earth is a 1958 British drama film directed by Vincent Sherman and written by Milton Holmes and Harold Buchman. The film stars Richard Todd, Juliette Gréco, John Kitzmiller, Finlay Currie, Laurence Naismith and Christopher Rhodes. The film was released on February 4, 1958, by 20th Century Fox.

Plot
The action takes place at the end of the nineteenth century, in East Africa. Danny Halloran, a Briton, comes to find a friend tobacco farmer but fails to do so. He discovers that the farmer died leaving a widow, Maria. Danny falls in love with the young woman and decides to marry her and take over the plantation. When the harvest fails, he goes hunting for crocodiles to trade their skins.

Cast    
Richard Todd as Danny
Juliette Gréco as Maria
John Kitzmiller as David
Finlay Currie as Father Verity
Laurence Naismith as Skin Trader
Christopher Rhodes as Al
Orlando Martins as Tribesman
Harold Kasket as Arab Captain

References

External links
 

1958 films
American historical drama films
20th Century Fox films
Films directed by Vincent Sherman
1950s historical drama films
British historical drama films
Films set in the 1890s
Films set in Africa
1958 drama films
1950s English-language films
1950s American films
1950s British films